Zeenat is a 1975 Pakistani film directed by S. Suleman. Shahnam played the titular role in the film opposite Nadeem and Shahid. It revolves around the sufferings of a baby girl and her journey to womanhood, until she is accepted by her grandfather, who hated her throughout his life. The Mehdi Hassan's ghazal featured in the film, "Rafta Rafta Wo Meri Hasti Ka Samaa Hogye" became hugely popular and he eventually went on to win a Nigar Award for it as a playback singer.

The film was a golden jubilee hit at box office. At 19th Nigar Awards it won five awards.

Plot 

Nawab Hashmat wants a male heir from his son Waqar and daughter in law Nargis due to the threats of division of property later on in life. However, when a girl, Zeenat is born the Nawab orders to have her killed. However on Waqar's and Nargis's begging, he leaves her on the condition she is to be raised with her servants away from her parents and the main house.
Owing to maternal mortality, (Childbirth) Zeenat's mother dies and her father is also killed in an accident, leaving her newly born brother Shaukat behind.

As Shaukat gets older, he does little except going out to clubs and wasting his grandfather's money on bad hobbies and habits. He transfers all the property on to his name by deception because his grandfather (the Nawab) refused to, due to his nature and bad habits. On the other hand, Zeenat gets married to Khurram, son of Nawab's hakim. Khurram goes abroad soon after his marriage and his mother throws Zeenat out of the house. She goes to her grandfather's house where the Nawab realises his mistake as the male heir he wanted at the time, now treats him badly. He eventually disowns Shaukat which brings him on to the right path. Khurram returns from abroad and yells at his mother for her bad deeds. He goes and brings Zeenat back home with proper rukhsati ceremony from her grandfather's house.

Cast 

 Shabnam in dual role as Nargis/ Zeenat
 Nadeem Baig as Waqar
 Shahid as Khurram
 Munawwar Zarif as Shaukat
 Agha Talish as Nawab
 Najma
 Najma Mehboob
 Tamanna

Awards 

Zeenat received 5 Nigar Awards in the following categories:

References 

1975 films
Pakistani romantic drama films
1970s Urdu-language films
Urdu-language Pakistani films